Rikin Shantilal Pethani (born 2 December 1990) is an Indian professional basketball player.  He currently plays for Chennai Slam of India's UBA Pro Basketball League.

He was a member of India's national basketball team at the 2016 FIBA Asia Challenge in Tehran, Iran.

He grew up in Himatnagar, Gujarat and played cricket until 8th grade, when a coach discovered his talent for basketball.

External links
 2016 FIBA Asia Challenge profile
 Asia-basket.com profile
 Real GM profile

References

1990 births
Living people
Indian men's basketball players
Basketball players from Gujarat
Centers (basketball)
Basketball players at the 2014 Asian Games
Asian Games competitors for India
People from Sabarkantha district